Dinawan Island is a Malaysian island located in the West Coast on the state of Sabah. It is located about 3.5 kilometres from the township of Kimanis near the mouth of the Kimanis River. The island is 73 m high and surrounded by reefs and sandbanks. The private owner operates a tourist resort on the island.

See also
 List of islands of Malaysia

References

External links
Dinawan Island Information

Islands of Sabah